Lesbia Claudina Vent Dumois (born November 6, 1932, in Cruces, Las Villas, Cuba) is a contemporary Cuban visual artist, whose works include illustration, painting, and engraving.  She does not specialize in any themes but is "interested in the everyday and historical references."

Vent Dumois studied at the Escuela de Artes Plásticas in Santa Clara, Cuba under Leopoldo Romañach. In 1961 she obtained a UNESCO fellowship to study lithography in Prague. In 1968 she was a member of the Taller Experimental de Gráfica (TEG), in Havana.

From 1980 to 1993 she was Director of Fine Arts at the Casa de las Américas in Havana, and since 1993 is Vice President of the Casa de las Américas.

Individual exhibitions
 1954 Grabados, in the Galería Habana, Arte y Cinema La Rampa, Havana, Cuba.
 1961 Engravings, in the Union of Fine Artists, Prague.

Collective exhibitions
 1952 Exposición de la Estampa Cubana, in the Museo de Bellas Artes de Toluca, Mexico City, Mexico.
 1959 16th National Exhibition of Prints, Washington, D.C., U.S.
 1977 Cuba Peintres d'Aujourd'hui, in the Musée d'Art Moderne de la Ville de Paris, Paris, France.
 1984  I Bienal de La Habana. Museo Nacional de Bellas Artes, Havana, Cuba.
 1995 1er Salón de Arte Cubano Contemporáneo. Museo Nacional de Bellas Artes, Havana, Cuba.

Awards
 1960, the Prize at the Primer Certamen Latinoamericano de Xilografía, Argentina.
 1972, Prize in the International Print Biennial Cracow'1972, Kraków, Poland.
 1996 Alejo Carpentier Medal, Council of State, Republic of Cuba.

Collections
 Casa de las Américas
 Collection of Engravings, in Berlin, Germany.
Museo de la Solidaridad, Santiago de Chile, Chile

References

 
 
 
 

Cuban contemporary artists
1932 births
Living people
Artists from Havana
Cuban painters
Modern painters
Cuban women painters
20th-century Cuban women artists
21st-century Cuban women artists